Cupra may refer to:

Automobiles
 Cupra Born, a battery electric compact car/small family car
 Cupra Formentor, a compact crossover sports utility vehicle (SUV)
 Cupra Racing, the high-performance motorsport subsidiary of Spanish automobile manufacturer SEAT
 Cupra Tavascan, an electric concept SUV
 Cupra Terramar, an upcoming compact crossover SUV
 Cupra UrbanRebel, an electric concept car
 SEAT Cupra Championship, a one-make touring car racing series that ran between 2003 and 2008
 SEAT Cupra GT, a grand tourer race car made by SEAT in 2003

Other uses
 The Latin name for the chemical element Copper
 Cupra (goddess), a chthonic fertility goddess
 Cupra Marittima, a commune in Marche, Italy